93rd meridian may refer to:

93rd meridian east, a line of longitude east of the Greenwich Meridian
93rd meridian west, a line of longitude west of the Greenwich Meridian